The QBU-88 sniper rifle is a Chinese bullpup designated marksman rifle developed by Norinco for the People's Liberation Army.

History
During the 1979 Sino-Vietnamese War, China captured samples of the Soviet-designed Dragunov sniper rifle, which it copied as the Type 79.  Due to immature gunsmithing techniques its firing pin could break from metallurgy issues and problems copying the PSO-1 4x scope made it unable to handle the recoil of firing its rounds.  These issues were addressed in the upgraded Type 85, but the PLA still used standard ball ammunition rather than specialized sniping cartridges, resulting in lower accuracy.  These shortfalls led to development of a new sniper rifle when China started development of a new cartridge for machine guns in the early 1990s.

The QBU-88 rifle (also sometimes referred to as Type 88 rifle) was the first weapon of the newest generation of Chinese small arms, chambered for proprietary 5.8×42mm DBP87 ammunition.  Adopted in 1997, the QBU-88 is, by the modern sense, not a true sniper rifle – it is more a designated marksman rifle, intended for aimed semi-automatic fire at ranges beyond the capabilities of standard infantry assault rifles.  The rifle is intended for rough military use, so it is fitted with adjustable iron sights by default, and is generally equipped with telescopic sights or with night sights.

QBU-88 rifle is optimized for a special heavy loading of 5.8×42mm cartridge with a longer streamlined bullet with steel core.  It can also fire standard ammunition intended for the QBZ-95 assault rifles. At the present time the QBU-88 rifle is in service with PLA and Chinese police forces.

Design details
The QBU-88 rifle is a gas-operated semi-automatic rifle.  It utilizes a short-stroke gas piston, located above the barrel, and three-lug rotating bolt. The action is mounted in the compact steel receiver, and enclosed into a polymer bullpup-type housing. To increase accuracy, the action is mated to a 640 mm (25.1 in) long, hammer-forged match-grade barrel. The safety switch is located at the bottom of the receiver, just behind the magazine opening.  The QBU-88 rifle is equipped with open, diopter-type adjustable sights, mounted on folding posts.  It also has a short proprietary dovetail rail on the receiver which can accept telescope or night sight scope mount.

The rifle is intended to be utilized primarily with optics.  The standard day optic used on the QBU-88 for military use is a Chinese 3-9×40 scope with an integral quick-release mount.  In 2008 a new Chinese 6-24×44 tactical scope became available for counter-terrorism and other law enforcement use.

The riflings for the QBU-88 differs from the standard QBZ-95 assault rifle. While the QBZ-95 has a  twist to stabilize the standard 64-grain DBP-87 ball round, the QBU-88 has a faster  twist to stabilize the 70-grain Heavy Ball round and dedicated Sniper load, similar to the QJY-88 general-purpose machine gun, which has progressive rifling with a final twist rate of 206 mm.  A long birdcage flash suppressor is fitted to reduce the muzzle signature.  A quick-detachable bipod is clamped to the barrel when required.

Variants
An export version called the QBU-97A is also produced and marketed for security forces of other foreign countries.  This derivative utilizes 5.56×45mm NATO ammunition although, instead of STANAG magazine, a modified version of QBU-88 magazine is used to feed the rounds – and STANAG magazines will not work unless modified. The QBU-97A has recently been sighted under the designation NQU03, though it is unknown if the two differentiate in any way aside from name.

See also
QBU-191 - designated marksman rifle based on QBZ-191 platform. 
QBU-141 - 5.8×42mm bolt-action sniper rifle developed by China
List of bullpup firearms
List of sniper rifles

References

Semi-automatic rifles
Sniper rifles of the People's Republic of China
Bullpup rifles
5.8 mm firearms
Designated marksman rifles
Norinco